Graae Glacier is a glacier  long on the north side of Mount Sabatier, flowing west-southwest to Trollhul in the south part of South Georgia. It was surveyed by the South Georgia Survey (SGS) in the period 1951–57, and named by the UK Antarctic Place-Names Committee for Morgens E.W. Graae of Denmark, who developed sledges for the SGS, 1953–54 and 1955–56.

See also
 List of glaciers in the Antarctic
 Glaciology

References

Glaciers of South Georgia